Walter Bingley (17 April 1930 – March 2017) was an English footballer born in Sheffield who played in the Football League for Bolton Wanderers, Sheffield Wednesday, Swindon Town, York City and Halifax Town.

After signing for Sheffield Wednesday in 1955, he helped the club gain promotion to Division One in his first season with them.

References

1930 births
2017 deaths
Footballers from Sheffield
English footballers
Association football defenders
Bolton Wanderers F.C. players
Sheffield Wednesday F.C. players
Swindon Town F.C. players
York City F.C. players
Halifax Town A.F.C. players
English Football League players